Pouteria myrsinoides subsp. reticulata, commonly known as axe-handle wood, is a flowering plant in the sapodilla family, Sapotaceae. The subspecific epithet refers to the reticulate venation (network-like pattern of the veins) on the leaves.

Description
It is a small tree growing to 6 m, occasionally 10 m, in height, with a watery, white latex. The alternate, oval leaves are usually 40–80 mm long and 20–40 mm wide. The inconspicuous green flowers, 8 mm long, appear from May to July. The pointed, egg-shaped fruits are 13 mm long.

Distribution and habitat
The subspecies is found on Australia's subtropical Lord Howe Island and the French territory of New Caledonia in the south-west Pacific Ocean. It is common at low elevations.

References

myrsinoides subsp. reticulata
Ericales of Australia
Flora of Lord Howe Island
Flora of New Caledonia
Plants described in 1890
Plant subspecies
Taxa named by Henri Ernest Baillon